The canton of La Bâtie-Neuve is a former administrative division in southeastern France. It was disbanded following the French canton reorganisation which came into effect in March 2015. It had 4,963 inhabitants (2012).

The canton comprised the following communes:

Avançon
La Bâtie-Neuve
La Bâtie-Vieille
Montgardin
Rambaud
La Rochette
Saint-Étienne-le-Laus
Valserres

Demographics

See also
Cantons of the Hautes-Alpes department

References

Former cantons of Hautes-Alpes
2015 disestablishments in France
States and territories disestablished in 2015